Michal Dalecký (born 30 December 1968) is a Czech rower. He competed in the men's coxed pair event at the 1992 Summer Olympics.

References

External links
 

1968 births
Living people
Czech male rowers
Olympic rowers of Czechoslovakia
Rowers at the 1992 Summer Olympics
Rowers from Prague